Maman Quta (Aymara mamani falcon, hawk, quta lake, "falcon lake",  Hispanicized spelling Maman Khota, Maman Kkota) is a mountain in the Cordillera Real in the Bolivian Andes, about  high. It is situated in the La Paz Department, Murillo Province, La Paz Municipality. Mama Quta lies southeast of Qala Wathiyani.

References 

Mountains of La Paz Department (Bolivia)